The 2013–14 FC Red Bull Salzburg season was the 81st season in club history. Red Bull Salzburg finished the season as champions of the Bundesliga and the ÖFB-Cup, completing a domestic double. In Europe, Salzburg where knocked out of the Champions League by Fenerbahçe in the Third Qualifying Round, dropping into the Europa League where they reached the Round of 16 before defeat to Basel.

Squad

Out on loan

Left during the season

Transfers

In

Out

Loans out

Released

Friendlies

Competitions

Overview

Bundesliga

League table

Results summary

Results by round

Results

Austrian Cup

Final

UEFA Champions League

Qualifying rounds

UEFA Europa League

Qualifying rounds

Group stage

Knockout phase

Statistics

Appearances and goals

|-
|colspan="14"|Players away on loan :

|-
|colspan="14"|Players who left Red Bull Salzburg during the season:

|}

Goal scorers

Clean sheets

Disciplinary Record

Notes

References

Red Bull Salzburg
Red Bull Salzburg
Red Bull Salzburg
2013-14 Red Bull Salzburg Season
Austrian football championship-winning seasons